Hedbergia longiflora, formerly Bartsia longiflora, is a species of flowering plants in the family Orobanchaceae.

It is an afromontane species, restricted to the mountains of northeastern Africa.

A subspecies, Hedbergia longiflora subsp. macrophylla Hedberg, has also been described.

Phylogeny 
The phylogeny of the genera of Rhinantheae has been explored using molecular characters. Hedbergia longiflora groups with Hedbergia decurva and Hedbergia abyssinica into a Hedbergia clade nested within the core Rhinantheae. These three taxa share evolutionary affinities with genera Tozzia, Bellardia, Neobartsia, Parentucellia, and Odontites.

References 

Hedbergia